A castle in the air is a daydream or fantasy. 

Castle in the Air may refer to:

 Castle in the Air (play), a 1949 play by Alan Melville
 Castle in the Air (film), a 1952 British comedy film based on the play
 Castle in the Air (novel), a 1990 young adult fantasy novel by Diana Wynne Jones
 the Castle in the Air, in the children's book The Phantom Tollbooth, where the princesses of Rhyme and Reason are banished

See also 
 Castles in the Air (disambiguation)
 Castle in the sky (disambiguation)